Elena Mirò is an Italian plus-size fashion house. It regularly stages biannual prêt-à-porter shows during Fashion Week.

The Elena Mirò brand originated in 1985 "within the Alba, Piedmont-based clothing company Vestebene (now Miroglio Fashion)." It focuses on clother for women "with fuller figures who wear shapely sizes".

Among its featured models are Jennie Runk, Crystal Renn, and Lizzie Miller.

References

External links
Elena Miro 

Italian brands
Plus-size models